Yang Xianzhen (July 24, 1896 – August 25, 1992) was a Chinese Communist politician who was the tenth president of the Party School of the Central Committee of the Communist Party of China, the highest training center for party workers and leaders. Yang served as its president from 1955 to 1961.

He became surrounded by the One Divides Into Two controversy in 1964 when his Two Unite into One philosophical concept was interpreted as supporting capitalist restoration.

Yang died in Beijing in 1992.

References

External links
China's establishment intellectuals
Memorial collection of Yang Xianzhen's work 100 years after his birth

Chinese Communist Party politicians from Hubei
1896 births
1992 deaths
Politicians from Shiyan
Members of the Kuomintang
People's Republic of China politicians from Hubei
61 Renegades
Marxist theorists
People's Republic of China philosophers
National Wuhan University alumni
Delegates to the 1st National People's Congress
Delegates to the 2nd National People's Congress
Members of the Standing Committee of the 3rd Chinese People's Political Consultative Conference
Members of the 4th Chinese People's Political Consultative Conference
Members of the Standing Committee of the 5th Chinese People's Political Consultative Conference
Members of the 8th Central Committee of the Chinese Communist Party
Members of the Central Advisory Commission